Hougang Stadium is a multi-purpose stadium located at the junction of Hougang Avenue 2 and Hougang Avenue 10 in Hougang, Singapore. 

It is currently used mostly for football matches and is the home stadium of Hougang United FC. 

The public can use the facilities from 4:30 am to 8:30 pm daily unless it is exclusively booked for a sporting event. 

The stadium has a capacity of 3,800 people. Is also used for Rugby matches and bowling competitions.

History
 From 1998 to 2003, it was home to the Marine Castle FC
 For the 2005 S.League season, Paya Lebar Punggol FC played their home games at the stadium.
 From 2006 to 2011, it was home to the newly merged club, Sengkang Punggol FC a.k.a. Hougang United.
 From 2012 to 2019, the rebranded Hougang United Football Club will play their home games here.
 From 2012 to present, this stadium is used for Rugby

References

Football venues in Singapore
Rugby union stadiums in Singapore
Multi-purpose stadiums in Singapore
Singapore Premier League venues
Hougang United FC